Pine Tree Run is a tributary of Pike Run in Somerset County, New Jersey in the United States.

Course

Sister tributaries
Back Brook
Cruser Brook

See also
List of rivers of New Jersey

References

External links
USGS Coordinates in Google Maps

Rivers of New Jersey
Tributaries of the Raritan River
Rivers of Somerset County, New Jersey